The M-2 was a computer developed at the Laboratory of Electrical Systems in the Institute of Energy of the USSR Academy of Sciences. The successor to the M-1, it was developed in 1952 by a team of engineers led by I.S. Brook (or Bruk).
The computer was developed and assembled in the period between April and December 1952. In 1953 M-2 became fully operational and was used for solving applied problems on round-the-clock basis, mostly having to do with nuclear fission and rocket design.
 
M-2 was the basis for several other Soviet computers, some of them developed at other research institutes.

References

External links 
  Google translation

Soviet computer systems
Soviet inventions